Zagórski (feminine Zagórska, plural Zagórscy) is a Polish surname. At the beginning of the 1990s there were approximately 7040 people in Poland with this surname.

When transcribed via the Russian language, it may be spelled Zagorsky, the Russian-language feminine form being Zagorskaya. In other languages, the surname may be phonetically transcribed as Zagurski.

People named Zagórski:

 Aiga Zagorska (born 1970), Lithuanian track and road cyclist
 Aniela Zagórska (1890–1943), Polish translator
 Dorota Zagórska (born 1975), Polish pairs skater
 Edmund Zagorski (1954–2018), American convicted murderer
 Jerzy Zagórski (1907–1984), Polish poet, essayist and translator
 Kazimierz Zagórski (1883–1944), Polish photographer
  (born 1967), Polish footballer
  (born 1967), Polish politician
 Sylwia Zagórska, Polish tennis player
 Tommy Zagorski (born 1984), American football coach
 Wacław Zagórski (1909–1982), Polish journalist
 Witold Zagórski (1930–2016), Polish basketball player and coach
 Wojciech Zagórski (born 1928), Polish actor
 Wojciech Zagórski (skier), see FIS Alpine World Ski Championships 2007 – Men's slalom
 Włodzimierz Zagórski (general) (1882–1927), Polish general
 Włodzimierz Zagórski (writer) (1834–1902), Polish writer, satirist; pseudonyms Chochlik, Publikola
 Pauline Lee Zagorski, previous married name of Pauline Hanson (born 1954), Australian politician

People named Zagorsky:
 Kyra Zagorsky (born 1976), American actress
 Nikolai Zagorsky (1849–1893), Russian painter
  (born 1955), Russian philatelist, publisher, businessman

Zagorski may also refer to:
 Zagorski (village), Bulgaria

Notes 

Polish-language surnames

pl:Zagórski